The 2011–12 All-Ireland Senior Club Hurling Championship was the 42nd staging of the All-Ireland hurling club championship since its establishment by the Gaelic Athletic Association in 1970.  The draw for the 2011-12 fixtures took place in August 2011. The championship began on 9 October 2011 and ended on 17 March 2012. Clarinbridge were the defending champions, however, they did not qualify for the championship.

Loughgiel Shamrocks secured the title with a 4-13 to 0-17 defeat of Coolderry in the All-Ireland final.
This was their second All-Ireland title.

Teams

A total of fifteen teams contested the championship, including all of the teams from the 2010–11. The Armagh champions did not participate.

The 2011–12 championship also saw a number of first-time participants. Carrigtwohill of Cork won their first county championship since 1918 and represented the county in the provincial series. Similarly, Na Piarsaigh in Limerick and Drom-Inch in Tipperary won their very first county titles and contested the Munster series for the first time.

Team summaries

Participating clubs

Fixtures

Leinster Senior Club Hurling Championship

Munster Senior Club Hurling Championship

Ulster Senior Club Hurling Championship

All-Ireland Senior Club Hurling Championship

Championship statistics

Scoring

 First goal of the championship: Patrick McCloskey for Kevin Lynch's against Loughgiel Shamrocks.
 Last goal of the championship: Liam Watson for Loughgiel Shamrocks against Coolderry.

Championship statistics

Top scorers

Top scorers overall

Top scorers in a single game

References

2011 in hurling
2012 in hurling
All-Ireland Senior Club Hurling Championship